Events from the 1230s in the Kingdom of Scotland.

Monarch 

 Alexander II, 1214–1249

Events 
 1230 – Beauly Priory and Ardchattan Priory are founded.
 25 September 1237 – the Treaty of York is signed by kings Alexander II of Scotland and Henry III of England, establishing the border between the two kingdoms.
 1238 – Inchmahome Priory is founded by Walter Comyn.
 15 May 1239 – Alexander II marries his second wife, Marie de Coucy.

Undated
 c. 1235 – the first identifiable Scottish parliament is held.

Births 
Full date unknown
 c. 1231 – Thomas of Galloway
 c. 1235 – Patrick de Graham (died 1296)
 c. 1235 – Reginald le Chen (died 1312)
 c. 1235 – William de Moravia, 2nd Earl of Sutherland (died 1307)

Deaths 

 31 December 1231 – Patrick I, Earl of Dunbar (born c. 1152)
 6 January 1233 – Matilda of Chester, Countess of Huntingdon (born 1171 in England)
 12 February 1233/1234 – Ermengarde de Beaumont (born c. 1170 in France)
Full date unknown
 1230 – Óspakr-Hákon, King of the Isles
 1233 – William Comyn, Lord of Badenoch (born c. 1163)
 1234 – Alan of Galloway
 1237 – Olaf the Black, King of the Isles
 1239 – Magnus II, Earl of Orkney (born c. 1185)

See also 

 List of years in Scotland
 Timeline of Scottish history

References 

1230s